J.D. Jackson may refer to:

 John David Jackson (physicist) (1925–2016), Canadian–American physics professor emeritus at the University of California, Berkeley and a faculty senior scientist emeritus at Lawrence Berkeley National Laboratory
 John David Jackson (boxer) (born 1963), American former professional boxer who competed from 1984 to 1999, and currently works as a boxing trainer
 J. D. Jackson (basketball) (born 1969), French basketball coach
 JD Jackson (actor), American actor and audiobook narrator